Peter Joseph Lavialle (July 15, 1819 – May 11, 1867) was a French-born prelate of the Catholic Church. He served as Bishop of Louisville from 1865 until his death in 1867.

Biography
Lavialle was born in Le Vigean, near Mauriac, Cantal, to Guillaume and Marie Jeanne (née Faure) Lavialle. He studied theology under the Sulpician Fathers. In 1842 he accepted an invitation from his relative, Bishop Guy Ignatius Chabrat, to join the Diocese of Louisville, Kentucky. Following his arrival in the United States, Lavialle continued his studies at the diocesan seminary and was ordained to the priesthood on February 2, 1844. He then served as a curate at the cathedral until 1849, when he became professor of theology at St. Thomas Seminary. In 1856 he was named president of St. Mary's College. He was appointed to succeed Antoine Blanc as Archbishop of New Orleans, Louisiana, in 1860, but he refused the honor.

On July 7, 1865, Lavialle was appointed Bishop of Louisville by Pope Pius IX. He received his episcopal consecration on the following September 24 from Archbishop John Baptist Purcell, with Bishops Jacques-Maurice De Saint Palais and John McGill serving as co-consecrators. During his short tenure, he conducted diocesan visitations, invited the Dominican Fathers and founded a convent for them, erected four churches in the episcopal see of Louisville alone. He attended the Second Plenary Council of Baltimore in October 1866.

Exhausted from his labors, Lavialle retired to St. Joseph's Infirmary and next to Nazareth, near Bardstown, where he later died at age 46. He was buried in the crypt of the Cathedral of the Assumption.

References

Episcopal succession

1820 births
1867 deaths
People from Cantal
French emigrants to the United States
French Roman Catholic missionaries
19th-century Roman Catholic bishops in the United States
Catholic Church in Kentucky
Religious leaders from Kentucky
Roman Catholic missionaries in the United States